The Balance of Nature is a 1983 British television drama film directed by Paul Annett, starring Leslie Ash.

Outline
The film is about the beauty business, seen mostly through the eyes of a Cockney girl from a tower block. Dawn Winch (Leslie Ash) lives with her mother (Marianne Stone) and works in a West End beauty parlour. She has aspirations to win the Miss United Kingdom competition, but finds that the beauty queen game is more of a jungle than she foresaw.

Cast
Leslie Ash as Dawn Winch
Philip Bretherton as Spencer Fairfax
Juliet Hammond as Natasha
Sandy Ratcliff as Julie
David Freedman as Gregore
Marianne Stone as Dawn's mother 
Hetty Baynes as Blanche
Francis Lloyd as Neville
Valerie Testa as Organiser
Sylvia Barter as Countess
Pamela Miles as Brenda

Notes

External links

1983 films
1983 drama films
British drama films
Films set in the 1970s
1980s English-language films
1980s British films